Jesús A. Permuy (born 1935) is a Cuban-American architect, urban planner, human rights activist, art collector, and businessman. He is known for an extensive career of community projects and initiatives in Florida, Washington, D.C., and Latin America.

Biography
Born in Havana, Cuba, Permuy studied architecture at the School of Architecture and Planning in the University of Havana. His studies were interrupted by the outbreak of the Cuban Revolution. Jesús played a leading role in the opposition to Fidel Castro and the Communist forces through the Movimiento de Recuperación Revolucionaria (Movement for Revolutionary Recovery – MRR), one of the most influential organizations in the anti-Castro counterrevolution. He was initially a leader of the MRR's student arm where he oversaw members and activities in seven of the thirteen schools of the University of Havana. He then joined the MRR's Security Division where he quickly became Secretary of Security before eventually being elevated to Civic Coordinator and finally National Coordinator of the MRR. Following the failed Bay of Pigs Invasion, he fled to Venezuela via the Venezuelan Embassy and remained there for several months under diplomatic protection until permanently relocating to the United States. There he continued both his architecture and urban planning studies and career as well as taking up activism championing the cause of democracy and human rights for the Cuban people in the face of abuses by the Castro government. As such, Permuy would become one of the leading figures organizing and mobilizing the international community in the against the Castro government from the 1970s to the early 2000s through various organizations and platforms, including the United Nations.

In addition to his career in architecture, planning, and community activism, Permuy was a key member of the early Latin art community of Miami as an art collector and gallery owner during the 1970s. He co-founded The Permuy Gallery with his first wife, prominent art dealer Marta Permuy, which became historically significant as one of the first Cuban Art galleries in South Florida following the Cuban exodus. Over the course of his career Permuy has had leading public roles in multiple civic, community, and religious organizations, including service as a longtime Councilman of the Agrupacion Catolica Universitaria, and has hosted a weekly radio show on Radio Paz. Following in his legacy, The Permuy family remains active in art, architecture, politics, and community initiatives.

Architecture and urban planning
After relocating to Miami in 1962 Permuy immediately continued working in the architecture field. During the 1960s and '70s, Permuy was part of the architecture teams behind several prominent Florida structures and landmarks including the New World Tower and the Clearwater Marine Aquarium. Alongside his architecture career, in 1967 he received a Master of City and Regional Planning degree from the Catholic University of America in Washington, D.C. and became certified by both the American Institute of Certified Planners (AICP) and the American Planning Association. His early planning roles were county-level management, first as Head Planner of the Anne Arundel County Planning and Zoning Department's Project Planning Section in Maryland. After relocating back to South Florida in 1970, he acted as Planning Division Supervisor of Metro Dade County (now Miami-Dade County) Department of Housing and Urban Development (HUD) until 1973, when the Miami Herald reported that he resigned from the position for the private sector role of Vice President of International Investment Group Inc.'s Housing and Development branch. He would later briefly return to the public sector to serve in Metro Dade County's Office of Transportation Administration, Chief Development Planning Branch from 1978 to 1980 and then served as an architecture and planning consultant thereafter.

Permuy's persistent community activism was key in the establishment of Little Havana's Jose Marti Park in 1980. He began efforts to establish a park for the significant Hispanic community in the area in 1972, applying his architecture and urban planning background as a community consultant to help select the eventual location in 1973. Permuy recommended a site on the Miami River, which was met with some protest, but unanimously approved by the Miami City Commission. Permuy would go on to be a member of the five-person jury that chose the final design from a pool of thirteen submissions. In 1983, Permuy was appointed by the Miami City Commission to the East Little Havana Task Force, which was assembled that year to investigate and combat the deteriorating economic and living conditions in the area as a result of the Mariel boatlift crisis. He was then elected Vice Chair of the Taskforce later that year. By 1984 he was made co-chairman and helped develop the East Little Havana Redevelopment Plan, which was submitted to the City of Miami at the conclusion of the Taskforce that year. Permuy was later appointed by El Salvador's President, José Napoleón Duarte to lead the Earthquake Reconstruction Committee in the aftermath of the 1986 San Salvador earthquake and consequently spent the following year training El Salvadorian officials on modern urban planning principals following the reconstruction.

Permuy has also been a frequent guest lecturer, traveling nationally and internationally to share his expertise and design philosophy with several leading institutions including Johns Hopkins University, Columbia University, the University of Miami, and Florida International University. He has had an extended relationship with the latter two, as he has served as a Jury Member for the University of Miami Department of Architecture and Planning and taught advanced senior and graduate-level urban planning courses at Florida International University in the 1980s. Permuy had also served on the City of Miami's Urban Development Review Board (UDRB), the Latin Community Board, and other civic and community boards, panels, and committees. He currently serves on the Miami-Dade County Social and Economic Development Council, and is a principal in the firm Permuy Architecture. In 2018, Miami River Commission chairman Horacio Aguirre declared him "one of Miami's finest architects" in a ceremony held in Permuy's honor that year.

Human rights activism
Jesus Permuy has been a key figure in spotlighting human rights in Cuba since the Cuban revolution over the course of his career. In 1974 Permuy founded the Center for Human Rights of Miami and served as its president for over thirty years. The center advocated for human rights internationally and helped connect families living in Cuba with their relatives in the United States. From 1976 to 2006, he led or represented other international organizations and non-governmental organizations (NGOs) that work on the world stage with Consultative Status in the United Nations, including the International Association of Educators for World Peace, and the International Association for the Defense of Religious Liberty. When Permuy began his international diplomatic trips in the 1970s, he funded his trips through grassroots small donations from the Miami community, including phone-in radio marathons, a tradition that would continue into the 1990s. He also served as the former Vice President of both the Human Rights Commission of Christian Democratic International (as well as the HRC co-founder), and the Christian Democratic Organization of America's Caribbean Region.

In his work advocating for international human rights, he has also served as president of the Christian Democratic Party of Cuba, as well as president and later chairman of the Cuban Municipalities in Exile. He was also president of the influential federation of over thirty Cuban organizations, Unidad Cubana (Cuban Unity) in addition to the Christian Democratic Movement of Cuba, both of which were active internationally to raise awareness to human rights abuses in Cuba and other Latin American dictatorships as well as engaging in lobbying and diplomatic efforts to enact change. By the late 1970s, Permuy had been elected President of the latter organization, also referred to as the Cuban Christian Democrat Movement. The Miami Herald's profile of the Cuban Christian Democrat Movement stated that Permuy spearheaded an international diplomatic strategy to call out the Castro regime's human rights abuses and work with other Christian-Democratic governments to withhold international support until governmental changes were made. At its peak in the 1980s, the group, often called by its Spanish abbreviation MDC, had chapters in several large cities with significant Cuban populations such as New York City and Los Angeles.

In 1984, the Center for Human Rights of Miami successfully lobbied to have Cuba's diplomatic representative Luis Sola Vila removed from a key subcommittee of the United Nations Human Rights Council and replaced with a representative from Ireland, a Christian-Democratic ally of Permuy's international campaign. By 1992, there had been a substantial change in Geneva as the UN Human Rights Council had shifted from initial rejection, then indifference and towards embrace of Permuy's diplomatic efforts. That year Permuy testified to the House of Representatives as President of the Christian Democratic Party to push for the Cuban Democracy Act during the Special Period in Cuba following the conclusion of the Cold War. The bill passed later that year. The following year (1993) Permuy was part of efforts to establish an independent news agency in Cuba to report news that was censored by the Castro government. In 1998 Permuy testified again to the United States Congress on the human rights situation in Cuba. In 2018, former Miami Mayor and radio personality Tomas Regalado credited Permuy with inventing the strategy of the international human rights campaign against the Castro regime, adding "Little by little, the human rights cause of Cuba became something of importance to the world. So when we write the real Cuban history, we owe several pages to Jesús." Coral Gables Mayor Raul Valdes-Fauli stated Permuy's "human rights activities on behalf of Cuba have been significant and very influential."

The arts
Permuy's work in the arts, particularly Cuban art, began in his years as a student in the University of Havana. In that time he was part of a well-regarded student design publication, Espacio, through which he became acquainted with many artists, including Amelia Peláez and José María Mijares. He began designing layouts for the magazine before serving as its last director when it was shut down in 1957 as a result of the Cuban Revolution. He also served as cultural secretary of the University Student Federation (Federacion Estudiantil Universitaria) and in 1959 organized a major week-long multidisciplinary art event in the university called Operación Cultura (Operation Culture). Held in the University of Havana's La Plaza Cadenas, Operación Cultura was designed to celebrate Cuban culture and showcase the university as a pro-democracy center of free thought in contrast to the Castro regime's increasing restraint of expression. The event drew an estimated 50,000 attendees and its participants included prominent Cuban cultural figures such as Mijares, writer Jorge Mañach, and members of the Cuban Vanguardia.

After relocating to the United States following the revolution, exiled Cuban artists struggled as their patrons had little to spend on the arts. As a result, many went back to school despite being known names in Cuba to become accredited in the American art market, though there were few spaces to display their work in the meantime. Recognizing this need and the role of art to help shape and reaffirm a community's cultural identity, Jesús co-founded the Permuy Gallery at 1901 Le Jeune Road in Coral Gables, Florida with his first wife, Cuban art dealer and patron Marta Permuy. Through its run in the early and mid 1970s, the Permuy Gallery was significant for being one of the first Cuban art galleries in the United States following the Cuban exodus and held many events, exhibitions, and cultural salon gatherings. It was also credited with beginning the Friday Gallery Nights tradition that continues in Coral Gables as a monthly event, though it was originally held every week. The gallery featured the artwork of several renowned and established Cuban artists as well as newcomers seeking to launch their careers across painting, ceramic, and sculpture. Many were friends of the Permuys while others would become part of their social circles through the gallery. Some notable featured artists included: Peláez, Mijares, René Portocarrero, Víctor Manuel García Valdés, Juan Gonzalez, Rafael Soriano, Emilio Falero, Dionisio Perkins, and Lourdes Gomez-Franca. Several of the artists shared a background in architecture with Permuy, such as Baruj Salinas, Miguel Jorge, and Rafael Consuegra which influenced their art.

The Permuy Gallery had a legacy that extended beyond its five-year run. The Permuys continued to host art salon gatherings of Cuban artists, collectors, writers, politicians, and business leaders in their Coral Gables residence, the Permuy House, in addition to occasional private exhibitions. In 2018 the Permuy Architecture firm began hosting an annual holiday art exhibition in honor of the Permuy Gallery and its legacy. The tradition is always held on a Friday as a nod to the Friday Gallery Nights and features artwork from the Permuy collection.

Family
Both Jesús Permuy's parents were Spaniards from the Galicia region and his ancestry is descendant of the Permuy family of minor Galician nobility through his father's lineage. His parents relocated to Cuba during the period of political turmoil in Spain between the Rif War and the Spanish Civil War. His father, a businessman, died when he was a child, therefore he and his two brothers were raised by their mother. After his own emigration to the United States and career there, he went on to have seven children with his first wife, Marta, and one child with his second wife Marie Carmen. His children and grandchildren have furthered his legacy in the community through their own subsequent careers. His eldest son, Ignacio Permuy, is also an architect and the President and founder of the Permuy Architecture firm, in which Jesús is a principal. Another son, Pedro Pablo Permuy, continued the family's active involvement in politics through an extensive career that included serving as a senior advisor to Secretary of State Madeleine Albright, and later being appointed by President Bill Clinton to serve as Deputy Assistant Secretary of Defense during his second term. Jesús Permuy is also uncle-in-law to the late MasTec and Cuban American National Foundation founder Jorge Mas Canosa. His other children and grandchildren are active in finance, construction, real estate, fashion, and design. The Permuy family also remains active in the arts as artists, collectors, dealers, and curators.

Recognition
Congressman Lincoln Díaz-Balart referenced Permuy in a speech on the floor of the U.S. House of Representatives in 1994 as "a distinguished member of the community that I am honored to represent". In 2010, the Miami-Dade County Mayor Carlos Álvarez and the County Commission awarded him a Certificate of Appreciation in recognition of his service on the Social and Economic Development Council and his work in the community. In 2017 Congresswoman Ileana Ros-Lehtinen gave a Statement of Congressional Record on the floor of the House of Representatives to pay tribute to his life and career and calling him "a shining example to us all". In 2018, a public ceremony was held in his honor during which Ros-Lehtinen presented him with a Flag of the United States that she had flown over the United States Capitol earlier that year in recognition of his community contributions. Permuy was also presented with the Key to the City of Coral Gables, Florida by Mayor Raul Valdes-Fauli. In October 2019, Miami-Dade County honored Permuy by co-designating a portion of Miami Avenue in Downtown Miami bordering Brickell Avenue and U.S. Route 1 as "Jesús A. Permuy Street". The resolution was sponsored by County Commissioner and former Miami Mayor Xavier Suarez and passed unanimously. The dedication ceremony was held in Miami City Hall on February 18, 2020, to coincide with the 60th anniversary of Permuy's involvement in a pro-democracy protest against the 1960 Havana state visit of top Soviet Premier Anastas Mikoyan to show the growing support and influence of the Soviet Union and the Castro regime. Speakers in the ceremony included his sons Ignacio and Pedro Pablo as well as former Miami Mayor Tomás Regalado, Coral Gables Vice Mayor Vince Lago, and the keynote delivered by Xavier Suarez.

References

1935 births
People from Havana
People from Coral Gables, Florida
Living people
Catholic University of America alumni
20th-century Cuban people
21st-century Cuban people
Cuban emigrants to the United States
Cuban expatriates in the United States
Exiles of the Cuban Revolution in the United States
Opposition to Fidel Castro
Cuban dissidents
Cuban revolutionaries
Cuban human rights activists
Architects from Florida
Cuban people of Spanish descent
American people of Cuban descent
American people of Spanish descent